Kalateh-ye Nay (also Romanized as Kalāteh-ye Nāy; also known as Nā’ī) is a village in Bala Velayat Rural District, in the Central District of Kashmar County, Razavi Khorasan Province, Iran. At the 2006 census, its population was 125, in 22 families.

References 

Populated places in Kashmar County